The Bud Freeman All-Stars featuring Shorty Baker is an album by saxophonist Bud Freeman with trumpeter Shorty Baker recorded in 1960 and originally released on the Swingville label.

Reception

AllMusic reviewer Scott Yanow stated: "Tenor-sax great Bud Freeman, who is often associated with the Eddie Condon school of Nicksieland, is heard heading an excellent swing quintet for this 1960 studio session. Trumpeter Harold "Shorty" Baker (best known for his periods with Duke Ellington) made too few small-group recordings throughout his life so this is one of his best ... the group plays superior standards and a couple of originals on this fine swing date".

Track listing
 "I Let a Song Go Out of My Heart" (Duke Ellington, Irving Mills, Henry Nemo, John Redmond) – 5:18
 "S'posin'" (Paul Denniker, Andy Razaf) – 5:41
 "March On, March On" (Esmond Edwards)– 4:49
 "Shorty's Blues" (Bud Freeman, Claude Hopkins, Shorty Baker) – 4:45
 "Love Me or Leave Me" (Walter Donaldson, Gus Kahn) – 5:18
 "Something to Remember You By" (Arthur Schwartz, Howard Dietz) – 4:41
 "Hector's Dance" (Freeman, Hopkins, Baker) – 3:26
 "But Not For Me" (George Gershwin, Ira Gershwin) – 4:26

Personnel 
Bud Freeman – tenor saxophone
Shorty Baker – trumpet
Claude Hopkins – piano
George Duvivier – bass
J. C. Heard – drums

References 

1960 albums
Bud Freeman albums
Shorty Baker albums
Swingville Records albums
Albums recorded at Van Gelder Studio
Albums produced by Esmond Edwards